Novoaleyskoye is a rural locality (a selo) and the administrative center of Novoaleysky Selsoviet, Tretyakovsky District, Altai Krai, Russia. The population was 469 as of 2013. There are 3 streets.

Geography 
Novoaleyskoye is located 53 km southeast of Staroaleyskoye (the district's administrative centre) by road. Verkh-Aleyka is the nearest rural locality.

References 

Rural localities in Tretyakovsky District